Playtika (Playtika Holding Corp.) is an Israel-based digital entertainment company specializing in the development and publication of mobile games. In 2021, Playtika had over 35 million monthly active users.

History
The company was founded in 2010 by Robert Antokol and Uri Shahak (son of former Chief of Staff of the Israel Defense Forces and Israeli Minister Amnon Lipkin-Shahak). In May 2011, the company was bought by Caesars Entertainment Corporation. Antokol remained the CEO of Playtika, and the company remained an independent unit within Caesars.

In July 2016, the company's operations were acquired by a Chinese consortium, valued at 4.4 billion dollars.

Headquartered in Herzliya, Israel, the company has over three thousand employees in offices worldwide including Tel-Aviv, London, Berlin, Vienna, Helsinki, Montreal, Chicago, Los Angeles, Las Vegas, Santa Monica, Sydney, Buenos Aires, Tokyo, Kyiv, Bucharest, Minsk, Dnipro, and Vinnytsia.

Playtika started off in the casino-style genre of "Social Casino Games". This genre uses the central elements of popular casino games but players cannot use real cash within the gameplay, nor can they win real money.

At January 2018, Playtika set up a $400 million Israel investment fund. The fund plans to invest in Israeli mobile and Internet digital entertainment and consumer product companies.

In October 2017, Playtika entered the casual games niche with its acquisition of the Israeli-based games studio, Jelly Button. In December 2018, the company took another step in its new diversification strategy with the acquisition of Berlin-based casual games studio, Wooga. In January 2019, the company acquired a Vienna-based casual games studio, Super treat.

In May 2019, the company launched an independent division dedicated to the creation and rapid development of casual games which plans to launch several new games every year.

The announcement introducing the new independent division was made at the company's Global Summit in Ibiza, where over 2,500 employees from Playtika's 16 locations around the world gathered for a company event.

In August 2019, Playtika acquired Finnish mobile game company Seriously, publisher of Best Fiends, a cartoon-style mobile game that launched in 2014.

In March 2020, Playtika will donate its catered meals and food to local communities to provide relief for the COVID-19 pandemic.

In January 2021, Playtika filed for an IPO. On January 20, 2021, Playtika completed its initial public offering of approximately 80M shares of common stock at $27 per share.

In March 2022, Playtika announced the company had acquired the Israel-based, online building and shooting simulator software development company JustPlay.LOL, most known for creating the multiplayer game 1V1.LOL.

In January 2023, Playtika offered a proposal to acquire the Finland-based, mobile game developer Rovio Entertainment, most known for creating the Angry Birds series of games and media for $734 million USD ($9.84 per share). Rovio later publically responded on January 20 that their board of directors were made unaware of the offer and that shareholder and regulatory approvals would be needed.

Games
The company operates the following games, among others:
 Best Fiends – puzzle video game
 Bingo Blitz – bingo
 Board Kings – casual game / board game style
 Caesars Slots – slot machines
 House of Fun – slot machines
 June's Journey – hidden object game
 Pearls Peril – hidden object game
 Pirate Kings
 Poker Heat – Texas hold 'em online poker
 Slotomania – slot machines
 Solitaire Grand Harvest – solitaire card game
 Vegas Downtown Slots – slot machines
 World Series of Poker – Texas hold 'em online poker based on the TV series of the same name

See also
Economy of Israel

References

External links

Video game companies established in 2010
Israeli companies established in 2010
Video game development companies
Video game companies of Israel
2021 initial public offerings
Companies listed on the Nasdaq
Companies based in Herzliya